The spermatic fascia is a bilayered fascia covering the testis; both layers are derived from abdominal muscle or fascia.

 The more superficial of these two layers, the external spermatic fascia, lies deep to the skin and dartos fascia of the testes, superficial to the cremaster muscle, and is a continuation of the aponeurosis of the external oblique muscle.  
 The deeper internal spermatic fascia is deep to the cremaster muscle, directly surrounds the spermatic cord and its contents, and is a continuation of the abdominal transversalis fascia.